Hiram Tuttle may refer to:

Hiram A. Tuttle (1837–1911), American merchant and politician
Hiram Tuttle (equestrian) (1882–1956), American Olympic horse rider